Oxynotus is a genus of sharks in the order Squaliformes, commonly known as the rough sharks. It is the only extant genus in the family Oxynotidae. They live in deep waters in the Atlantic and western Pacific Oceans.

Their bodies are compressed, giving them a triangular cross-section. They have two large dorsal fins, each with a sharp spine, and with the first fin placed far forward above the head. Even more so than their relatives, the dogfishes, they have rough and prickly skin. Unusually among sharks, they also possess a luminous organ.

Species
 Oxynotus bruniensis Ogilby, 1893 (prickly dogfish)
 Oxynotus caribbaeus Cervigón, 1961 (Caribbean roughshark)
 Oxynotus crochardi
 Oxynotus centrina Linnaeus, 1758 (angular roughshark)
 Oxynotus japonicus Ka. Yano & Murofushi, 1985 (Japanese roughshark)
 Oxynotus paradoxus Frade, 1929 (sailfin roughshark)

See also

 List of prehistoric cartilaginous fish

References

 
Aquitanian genus first appearances
Extant Miocene first appearances
Marine fish genera
Shark genera
Taxa named by Constantine Samuel Rafinesque